Malta competed at the 1984 Summer Paralympics in Stoke Mandeville, Great Britain and New York City, United States. 1 competitor from Malta won no medals and so did not place in the medal table.

See also 
 Malta at the Paralympics
 Malta at the 1984 Summer Olympics

References 

Malta at the Paralympics
Nations at the 1984 Summer Paralympics
1984 in Maltese sport